Steven Kwok Wing-kin (born 30 November 1986) is a Hong Kong politician and the chairman of the Labour Party since 2017. He is also a former member of the Tai Po District Council.

Biography
Kwok was educated at the University of Hong Kong (HKU) and was the president of the Hong Kong University Students' Union and the chairman of the Standing Committee of the Hong Kong Federation of Students (HKFS). He ran in the "Five Constituencies Referendum" launched by the pan-democrats under the banner of "Tertiary 2012" in 2010. He ran in New Territories West against Albert Chan and received 6,192 votes, 4.6 percent of the vote.

He became member of the Labour Party, a pro-democratic social democratic party established in 2011. He ran in the 2012 Legislative Council election with Fernando Cheung in New Territories East and helped Cheung to be re-elected.

In a Tai Po District Council by-election in San Fu in July 2015, he was elected with 1,392 votes, becoming the first Labour member to be elected to the District Councils. His office just lasted four months when he lost his seat in the 2015 District Council elections, becoming the shortest serving District Councillor in history.

He partnered with Fernando Cheung in the 2016 Legislative Council election again and the duo received 49,800 which saw Cheung re-elected successfully.

In 2017 Labour party leadership, he was elected the new party chairman, after former chairwoman Suzanne Wu resigned amidst the internal rift in the party in the earlier month.

He joined the pro-democracy primary for the 2018 New Territories East by-election, competing against Tommy Cheung and Gary Fan for the seat left vacant by Baggio Leung who was disqualified over the oath-taking controversy.

Arrest
Kwok was arrested on 1 November 2020, along with six other democrats, in connection with the melee that had broken out in the LegCo on 8 May 2020. On that day, Starry Lee, the incumbent chair of the House Committee of the Legislative Council, had attempted to commence a meeting of the Committee after extended stalling tactics of the pan-democratic camp over the previous months.

References

1986 births
Living people
Alumni of the University of Hong Kong
HKFS people
District councillors of Tai Po District
Labour Party (Hong Kong) politicians